Sayed Ihsanuddin Taheri, or Sayed Ihsan Taheri ( / ) (born in December 1984), is an Afghan civil activist, politician and independent author, writer and blogger who was a 2012 World Vision International PeaceMaker Prize nominee. He is an official of the government of the Islamic Republic of Afghanistan, who has held various positions since 2002.

Taheri is working as Director General Finance and Administration at the Ministry of Finance of Afghanistan and executes the tasks of the Deputy Minister for Administration as OiC. He previously worked as Communications Director to the Afghan President at the Office of Public and Strategic Affairs of the Government of Afghanistan. 

Taheri is member of the Leadership Committee of Afghan Red Crescent Society. On the other hand, he is the chairman to the Board of Directors of the Afghanistan State-owned corporations such as: 1) Ariana Afghan Airlines, 2) Bakhtar Afghan Airlines, 3) Afghan Telecom - Afghanistan Telecommunications Company, and 4) Afghanistan High Security Printing Press.

Taheri was Spokesperson to the Afghanistan High Peace Council (Afghan Peace Process) and Director of Media and Strategic Communications in the Government Secretariat for Peace Process. He is the founding member of Afghanistan 3rd Trend (روند ٣ افغانستان) Afghanistan's Youth Socio-Political Trend. He is elected member of the FINA - International Swimming Federation-'s Media Committee representing Asia. Taheri worked with Afghanistan National Swimming Federation as Elected President for three years - 2016-2019. 

Previously, he headed the Afghan Government Monitoring and Evaluation Authority at the Administrative Office of the President - AOP- of the Islamic Republic of Afghanistan. More, he served in the Presidential Office of Administrative Affairs and Council of Ministers Secretariat as Director of Information and Public Relations and Afghan Government Spokesperson. 

Before that, he served at the Ministry of Education as Advisor to the Minister in Mass Communications and TV development where he developed the Educational Radio and Television of Afghanistan "MARIF rtv" to a better quality picture to gain more and further viewers. He was awarded as Universal Peace Federation – Netherlands Ambassador for Peace to Afghanistan. 
  
From 1996 to 2001, during Taliban regime in Afghanistan, Taheri lived in Pakistan with his family. He helped young Afghan immigrants and Pakistani students teaching English as a second language and various computer programs. In addition, he also gave tuition of school books to the Afghan children. He started serving his country in diverse forms when he was 15.

Taheri worked for the JEMB (Joint Electoral Management Body) and the AIEC (Interim Afghan Election Commission) that was established to run the first Presidential and Parliamentary Elections after 2001 where he and his colleagues managed to register 11.5 million Afghan voters and in the Constitution-forming process in several senior positions.  These projects were jointly lead and managed by the Government of Afghanistan and United Nations office in Afghanistan, UNAMA.  He worked with the Vice President of Afghanistan as Executive Assistant for two years.

Taheri has attended many conferences nationally and internationally on the issues relevant to young generation of Afghanistan, political and election affairs, contributing with analyzing the current situation and making recommendations. He is an active member of the peace process in his country; as a young Afghan he took part in Afghanistan's post 2001 historical processes including the making of the Constitution, the first-ever presidential elections, the Afghanistan-Pakistan Joint Peace Jirga, and Consultative Loya jirga for talks on Afghan – American Strategic Partnership. He was leading the Protocol and Formalities Committee of the 2013 Afghanistan Consultative Loya Jirga on Bilateral Security Agreement with the United States, the BSA. He also lead the Press and Media Committee of the Afghanistan Peace Consultative Jirga which took place in 2019 requested by the state to develop a roadmap for the government to kick off peace talks with the Taliban. 

Taheri has been quoted as saying: "Working for the poor and helping them is a wish that I want to convert into reality."

References 

 Taheri leads the Executive Committee meeting of Ariana Afghan Airlines
 Pakistan Newspapers banned in Afghanistan
 New York Times quotes Ihsan Taheri
 New Wedding Law in Afghanistan
 Afghan Governors changed by Presidential Decree
 New Afghan Mining Law
 Ihsan Taheri – 2012 World Vision International Peacemaker Prize Nominee
 Ihsan Taheri – a Young Afghan in the Peace Talks between Afghanistan and Pakistan
 A look at the Life Condition of Afghan Women
 Thoughts on the Afghan Youth
 500 Afghan Students Freed from Freeze by Ambassador for Peace
 Afghanistan: Yesterday, Today and Tomorrow: Report of Trip to Netherlands by UPF-NL group page
 Participation in different International Conferences – UNESCO 2009 Education Conference
 Ihsan Taheri Leading a Change Team to the Education Radio Television of Afghanistan
 FINA recognized Afghanistan Swimming federation's New Elected President Sayed Ihsanuddin Taheri

External links 
 Office of the Afghan Government and Council of Ministers Secretariat Official Website
 Facebook Page of Office of Afghan Government's Directorate of Information and Public Relations
 Ihsan Taheri a young blogger
 Ihsan Taheri interviewed by Noor TV, Kabul

Youth activists
Living people
People from Kabul
1984 births
Afghan Tajik people
Afghan bloggers
Afghan government officials
Spokespersons